The Girl and the Count is a 1966 Danish family film directed by Finn Henriksen and starring Dirch Passer.

Cast
 Dirch Passer - Andreas Lillelys
 Josephine Passer - Lulu Hansen
 Lene Tiemroth - Susanne 'Sus' Hansen
 Peter Steen - Grev Ditmar Gyldenstjerne
 Karin Nellemose - Grevinde Constance Gyldenstjerne
 Malene Schwartz - Irene Gyldenstjerne
 Cleo Jensen - Doris
 Karl Stegger - Søren
 Ove Sprogøe - Nielsen
 Sigrid Horne-Rasmussen - Kokkepigen 'Putte'
 Carl Ottosen - Godsforvalter Lauritsen
 Paul Hagen - Bastian Gyldenstjerne
 Preben Mahrt - Theodor Gyldenstjerne
 Preben Kaas - Skuespiller
 Poul Bundgaard - Skuespiller
 Daimi - Skuespiller
 Bjørn Spiro - Sælger af mejetærsker

References

External links

1966 films
Danish children's films
1960s Danish-language films
Films directed by Finn Henriksen